Litsey (Lyceum in English) is a Russian pop rock girl group from Moscow, formed on 12 December 1991. The original band's imagery – teen female trio with guitars – was unusual in post-Soviet Russia. While the band line-up was changed several times, vocalist Anastasiya Makarevich has remained the unchanged member of the group since its inception. The band is best known for the songs "Osen'" (Осень; Autumn) and "Kak ty o nyom mechtala" (Как ты о нём мечтала; How You Have Dreamed of Him). Original trio debuted in 1991 with АВВА's song "One of Us" on the TV show Morning Star (Утренняя звезда).

Litsey was on top of the Russian music charts in 1990s and 2000s with several songs.

As of 2016, Litsey is Anastasiya Makarevich, Sofia Taikh, and Anna Shchegoleva. The group producer was Alexey Makarevich. Since the beginnings, Makarevich is the only unchanged band member. Also, the project was focused on her as lead figure, and she is the step-daughter of the producer Alexey Makarevich.

Line-up

Discography 
 «Домашний арест» — 1992
Track-listing

 «Подруга — ночь» — 1994
Track-listing 

 «Открытый занавес» — 1996
Track-listing

 «Паровозик-облачко» — 1997
Track-listing

 «Для тебя» — (Live-концерт в ГЦКЗ «Россия») — 1997
Track-listing

 «Живая коллекция» (Live концерт в телепрограмме «Живая коллекция») — 1998
Track-listing 

 «Небо» — 1999
Track-listing

 «Ты стала другой» — 2000
Track-listing

 «44 минуты» — 2005
Track-listing

 «Grand collection» — 2008
Track-listing

Music videos 
 «Подруга ночь» (1995)
 «Красная помада» (1996)
 «Осень» (1996)
 «Три сестры» (с Васей Богатырёвым) (1996)
 «Паровозик-облачко» (1997)
 «Расставание» (1997)
 «Москвичи» (с Л.Лещенко) (1997)
 «Солнце скрылось за горою» (1998)
 «День Победы» (с Л.Лещенко) (1998)
 «Небо» (1999)
 «Рыжий пёс» (1999)
 «Новый год» (Все звезды) (2000)
 «Ты стала другой» (2000)
 «Лолита» (в клипе Виктора Зинчука) (2000)
 «Планета пять» (2000)
 «Лей, дождь» (2001)
 «Улетаешь в небо» (2001)
 «Ты станешь взрослой» (2002)
 «Двери открой» (2004)
 «Фотография» (2015)

Awards 
 1994 — "Silver microphone" at «Хит-парад Останкино» contest
 1994 — "Musical examen" — Best band of 1994 (Saint Petersburg)
 1995 — "Ovation" («Овация») award in category "Breakthrough of the year"
 Laureate of the festival Pesnya goda:
 «Pesnya goda 1993» — «Хороший парень»
 «Pesnya goda 1994» — «Домашний арест»
 «Pesnya goda 1998» — «Незнакомка»
 «Pesnya goda 2002» — «Ты станешь взрослой»
 «Pesnya goda 2003» — «Как ты о нём мечтала»
 «Pesnya goda 2003» — «Падает дождь»
 «Pesnya goda 2004» — «Двери открой»
 «Pesnya goda 2005» — «Облака»
 Laureate of Golden Gramophone Award:
 1996 — «Осень»
 1996 — group album «Открытый занавес» reached top 10 of best-sold CDs of Soyuz recording company («СОЮЗ»).
 May 1996 — Song «Осень» was awarded with "100% hit" («Стопроцентный хит») by the magazine "Alla" («Алла»).

References

External links

 
 
 Official page on vk.com
 Official facebook page
 Группа «Лицей»: с 1990-х до наших дней

Russian girl groups
Russian pop music groups
Russian rock music groups
Musical groups established in 1991
Musical groups from Moscow
Russian musical trios
Winners of the Golden Gramophone Award